The 1945–46 Toronto Maple Leafs season was the 29th season of play of the Toronto NHL franchise. Although the club was the defending Stanley Cup champion, the team's play declined and the club finished in fifth, missing the playoffs.

Offseason
Cup hero goaltender Frank McCool held out. The Maple Leafs decided to play the tandem of Baz Bastien and Gordie Bell.

Regular season
Without Frank McCool, the team only won three of the first thirteen games, and the Leafs and McCool came to terms. The club continued to struggle and only won eight of the first 28 games. Turk Broda returned from war-time duty in January, but the team continued to struggle. All-Star defenceman Babe Pratt was suspended, but was reinstated after nine games. The team won only two of the nine games and dropped out of playoff contention. The club finished in fifth place, out of the playoffs. The team was only the second team to miss the playoffs after winning the Cup.

Final standings

Record vs. opponents

Schedule and results

Player statistics

Regular season
Scoring

Goaltending

Awards and records

Transactions
July 9, 1945: Traded Reg Hamilton to the Chicago Black Hawks for cash and Future Considerations
September 22, 1945: Acquired Gordie Bell from the Buffalo Bisons of the AHL for cash
October 16, 1945: Signed Free Agent Jimmy Thomson
October 29, 1945: Traded Bingo Kampman to the Boston Bruins to complete a previous transaction
November 6, 1945: Acquired Bingo Kampman from the Boston Bruins as Boston returned player

References
 
Notes

Toronto Maple Leafs seasons
Toronto
Tor